Chonlawit Kanuengkid (born April 20, 1992) is a Thai professional footballer who plays as a midfielder for a Thai League 1 club Lamphun Warrior.

Honours

Club
 Lamphun Warriors
 Thai League 2 (1): 2021–22

References

External links
 

1992 births
Living people
Chonlawit Kanuengkid
Association football midfielders
Chonlawit Kanuengkid
Chonlawit Kanuengkid
Chonlawit Kanuengkid